Almaza Air Force Base Airport is a regional airport in north-eastern Cairo, the capital of Egypt. It was established as a civilian aerodrome, but was partly taken over by the British military, designated RAF Heliopolis and later RAF Almaza. Today it is a military aerodrome of the Egyptian Air Force as well as regional civil airport.

History
The aerodrome was established in the Cairo suburb of Heliopolis in February 1910, when Baron Empain organised the first air meeting in Africa. The event was supervised by the Aéro-Club de France, and attracted several leading French aviators, including Hubert Latham, Henri Rougier, Jacques Balsan, Hubert Le Blon, Arthur Duray, and Mme. Raymonde de Laroche. Other entrants included Hans Grade from Germany, Frederick van Riemsdijk from the Netherlands, and Hayden Sands from the USA (although apparently not an official entrant). The only British flier A. Mortimer Singer crashed during a practice flight, breaking his leg, and was forced to withdraw. The aerodrome remained active until the First World War, when the British Army built a new airfield immediately to the south-east. The original airfield site has now been completely built over, and is partially occupied by the Egyptian Military Academy.

During World War I the aerodrome was operated by the British Royal Flying Corps, housing several squadrons as well as a training wing, and then the Royal Air Force, being designated RAF Heliopolis in April 1918. In the inter-war period it remained an active RAF base, housing several squadrons, including No. 208 Squadron RAF which was based there almost continuously from 1927 until 1942.

In the 1920s it was named Almaza Airport by the Egyptian government. It became the first base of the Egyptian Army Air Force (EAAF) when on 2 June 1932 the first five de Havilland Gipsy Moth trainer aircraft arrived from Hatfield Aerodrome, north of London, flown by three Egyptian and two British pilots. The EAAF became independent in 1937 and was renamed the Royal Egyptian Air Force (REAF).

In December 1931 the Egyptian Parliament approved the formation of an Anglo-Egyptian company to undertake civil aviation enterprises in Egypt. The company, named Misr Airwork S.A., was empowered to establish and operate flying training schools, local passenger flights, service stations, housing, provisioning, maintenance and repair of civil aircraft, aerial photography and survey, as well as regular and occasional air transport services for carrying passengers, mail and freight. By 1938 the company, based at Almaza, was flying regular scheduled flights between Cairo and Alexandria, and to Assiut, Nicosia, Haifa, and Baghdad, operating a fleet comprising a D.H. Dragon, D.H. Dragonfly, three D.H.86s and five D.H. Rapides. The company became fully Egyptian-owned in 1948, was nationalized in 1949, and was renamed United Arab Airlines in 1961, and then EgyptAir in 1971.

During World War II the military aerodrome was renamed RAF Almaza, becoming EAF Almaza in 1947. Jane's Fighting Aircraft of World War II lists the EAF, roughly circa 1948, with six squadrons, of which Nos 1 and 3-6 were all at Almaza.

At the end of a training regime from January to mid-March 1942 (involving the handling of Italian and German weapons, sabotage and parachutism), the French SAS company executed a surprise mock attack against the aerodrome of Heliopolis without the knowledge of the garrison and its commander.

In 1956, during the Suez crisis, it was bombed several times by the British. Almaza at that time had 25 MiG-15/17s, four Meteors, 21 Vampires, and ten Il-28s.

On 5 February 1962 it witnessed the reception of Yuri Gagarin by Zakaria Mohieddin.

Almaza AFB Airport
In 2016 Almaza is the home to several Egyptian Air Force units, flying trainer and transport aircraft, helicopters, and VIP transports. Several private charter airlines also operate from there.

References

External links

 

Airports in Egypt
Transport in Cairo
Egyptian Air Force bases